Daniel Bertolini (October 19, 1985) is an American baseball coach and former shortstop, who is the current head baseball coach at Youngstown State. He played college baseball at Mercyhurst University for coach Joe Spano from 2005 to 2008 before playing 1 season in the Frontier League in 2008. He was the head coach at Mercyhurst North East (2009–2016).

Playing career
Bertolini attended Poland Seminary High School in Poland, Ohio. Bertolini played for the school's varsity baseball and basketball teams for three years. Bertolini then enrolled at Mercyhurst University, to play college baseball for the Mercyhurst Lakers baseball team.

As a freshman at Mercyhurst University in 2005, Bertolini had a .268 batting average, a .333 on-base percentage (OBP) and a .307 SLG.

As a sophomore in 2006, Bertolini batted .269 with a .340 SLG, 2 home run, and 24 RBIs.

In the 2007 season as a junior, Bertolini hit 1 home run, 11 doubles and had 31 RBIs. He was named Honorable Mentional All-Great Lakes Intercollegiate Athletic Conference,

Bertolini had another solid season as a senior in 2008, hitting 7 doubles, 1 home run, 18 RBIs, a .319 batting average and slugged .380. He was named Second Team All-GLIAC.

Upon his graduation, Bertolini signed with the Midwest Sliders of the Frontier League. Bertolini hit just .186 in 24 games for the Sliders.

Coaching career
Bertolini was named the head baseball coach of Mercyhurst North East in 2009. During the 2013–2014 season, Bertolini spent the season as an assistant men's basketball coach for the Saints. In April 2015, Bertolini earned his 200th career victory for the Saints. Bertolini had a career-record of 229–185 and winning National Junior College Athletic Association Division II Region 3 titles in 2012 and 2014.

On June 21, 2016, Bertolini was named the 9th head coach in Youngstown State Penguins baseball history.

Head coaching record

See also
 List of current NCAA Division I baseball coaches

References

External links

Youngstown State Penguins bio

Living people
1985 births
Baseball shortstops
Mercyhurst Lakers baseball players
Mercyhurst North East Saints baseball coaches
Junior college men's basketball coaches in the United States
Youngstown State Penguins baseball coaches
Baseball coaches from Ohio
Baseball players from Youngstown, Ohio